Jay Stay Paid is the fifth studio album by album by American hip hop producer and rapper J Dilla. It was released as a posthumous album on June 2, 2009, by Nature Sounds. Despite the fact that the album has contributing vocals from several artists, it is roughly classified as an instrumental hip hop album.

Background
The album is a 28-track collection of unreleased Dilla beats mixed and arranged by Pete Rock. Although Jay Stay Paid is mostly instrumental, it includes guests vocals from several artists that Dilla worked with or admired, such as Black Thought, Havoc, Raekwon, MF DOOM, and M.O.P. It was executive produced by Dilla's mother Maureen "Ma Dukes" Yancey along with the musical supervision of Dilla's musical idol, Pete Rock. In regard to the album's feel and direction Ma Dukes stated:

Art Direction and illustrations for Jay Stay Paid were contributed by world-renowned graphic artist Mike Orduna (Fatoe) for Fatoe.com.

In promotion for the album, the Beat Junkies released a free sampler of the album.

The format of the album plays like a radio show with Pete Rock as the program director. With regards to Pete's involvement, Ms. Yancey gets very excited, “Dilla wanted to pattern himself behind Pete. His dream was to become as close as possible to what Pete stood for. Pete meant everything to him. Dilla would have just been flabbergasted! ” Pete's sentiments were the same toward Dilla, “Dude was amazing. He just kinda came outta nowhere and the more you heard his beats the better they got. He may not be here with us, but it’s all good we’re going to keep his music alive and well.”

The album debuted at the No. 96 on the Billboard charts with a total of 5,400 copies sold in its first week.

In July 2009, video director Derek Pike shot a video for the single "24k Rap" featuring Havoc and Raekwon.

Track listing

References

External links
Official website

2009 albums
J Dilla albums
Instrumental hip hop albums
Instrumental albums
Pete Rock albums
Albums produced by Pete Rock
Albums produced by J Dilla
Nature Sounds albums
Albums published posthumously